Ichthyocampus is a genus of pipefishes found in the Indian and Pacific Oceans.

Species
There are currently two recognized species in this genus:
 Ichthyocampus bikiniensis Herald, 1953
 Ichthyocampus carce (F. Hamilton, 1822)

References

Syngnathidae
Marine fish genera
Taxa named by Johann Jakob Kaup